Rune Elmqvist (1906–1996) developed the first implantable pacemaker in 1958, working under the direction of Åke Senning, senior physician and cardiac surgeon at the Karolinska University Hospital in Solna, Sweden.

Elmqvist initially worked as a medical doctor (having trained in Lund), but later worked as an engineer and inventor.

In 1948, he developed the first inkjet ECG printer which he called the mingograph while working at Elema-Schönander, a company which later became Siemens-Elema. In 1957, he received an honorary doctorate.

In 1960, he became head of development at Elema-Schönander. Siemens-Elema's pacemaker operations were sold to the American company Pacesetter Systems in 1994, which was subsequently sold to St Jude Medical.

References

1906 births
1996 deaths
20th-century Swedish inventors
Lund University alumni
Swedish cardiac surgeons
20th-century surgeons